Winter Rider No. 2, also known as Winter Rider Variation, is an outdoor bronze sculpture by American artist James Lee Hansen, located on the Transit Mall of downtown Portland, Oregon.

Description and history

Winter Rider No. 2 is a bronze sculpture by James Lee Hansen, located at the intersection of Southwest 6th Avenue and Taylor Street, Portland Transit Mall. It was installed at its current location in February 2010; previously, it was installed at the Public Service Building. The sculpture is owned by the Douglas Goodman family and is on loan to the city as part of the Transit Mall's Northwest sculpture collection.

Hansen's Talos No. 2 (1977) is also installed on the Transit Mall, at the intersection of Southwest Sixth Avenue and Stark Street.

See also

 2003 in art
 List of equestrian statues in the United States
 The Falconer (Hansen), a sculpture by Hansen formerly installed at the University of Oregon

References

External links
 A Guide to Portland Public Art, Regional Arts & Culture Council (PDF)

2003 establishments in Oregon
2003 sculptures
Abstract sculptures in Oregon
Bronze sculptures in Oregon
Equestrian statues in Oregon
Outdoor sculptures in Portland, Oregon
Sculptures by James Lee Hansen
Sculptures on the MAX Green Line
Southwest Portland, Oregon
Statues in Portland, Oregon